In Russian grammar, the system of declension is elaborate and complex. Nouns, pronouns, adjectives, demonstratives, most numerals and other particles are declined for two grammatical numbers (singular and plural) and six grammatical cases ; some of these parts of speech in the singular are also declined by three grammatical genders (masculine, feminine and neuter). This gives many spelling combinations for most of the words, which is needed for grammatical agreement within and (often) outside the proposition. Also, there are several paradigms for each declension with numerous irregular forms.

Russian is more conservative in its declensions than many other modern Indo-European languages (English, for example, has almost no declensions remaining in the language).

Nouns
Nominal declension is subject to six cases – nominative, accusative, genitive, prepositional, dative, instrumental – in two numbers (singular and plural), and absolutely obeying grammatical gender (masculine, feminine, and neuter). Up to ten additional cases are identified in linguistics textbooks, although all of them are either incomplete (do not apply to all nouns) or degenerate (appear identical to one of the six simple cases). The most recognized additional cases are locative ( — in the forest, on the bridge, in (the) blood), partitive ( — (some) tea, sugar, cognac), and several forms of vocative ( — (O) Lord, God, father). The adjectives, pronouns, and the first two cardinal numbers further vary by gender. Old Russian also had a third number, the dual, but it has been lost except for its use in the nominative and accusative cases with the numbers two, three and four (e.g.  , "two chairs", now reanalyzed as genitive singular).

Russian noun cases often replace the usage of prepositions in other Indo-European languages. Their usage can be summarised as:
 Nominative – the “subject” case
 Accusative – the “direct object” case
 Genitive – corresponding to the possessive case or “of + (noun)”
 Prepositional – used with certain prepositions, such as “in”, “on” etc.
 Dative – corresponding to “to + (noun)" or the indirect object
 Instrumental – denoting an instrument used in an action

There are no articles, neither definite nor indefinite (such as the, a, an in English), in the Russian language. The sense of a noun is determined from the context in which it appears. That said, there are some means of expressing whether a noun is definite or indefinite. They are:
 The use of a direct object in the genitive instead of the accusative in negation signifies that the noun is indefinite, compare: "" ("I don't see a book" or "I don't see any books") and "" ("I don't see the book").
 The use of the numeral one sometimes signifies that the noun is indefinite, e.g.: "?" – "" ("Why did it take you so long?" – "Well, I met one [=a] friend and had to talk").
 Word order may also be used for this purpose, compare "" ("Into the room rushed a boy") and "" ("The boy rushed into the room").
 The plural form may signify indefiniteness: "" ("You can buy this in shops") vs. "" ("You can buy this in the shop").

The category of animacy is relevant in Russian nominal and adjectival declension. Specifically, the accusative has two possible forms in many paradigms, depending on the animacy of the referent. For animate referents (sentient species, some animals, professions and occupations), the accusative form is generally identical to the genitive form (genitive-accusative syncretism). For inanimate referents (simple lifeforms, objects, states, notions), the accusative form is identical to the nominative form (nominative-accusative syncretism). This principle is relevant for masculine singular nouns of the second declension (see below) and adjectives, and for all plural paradigms (with no gender distinction). In the tables below, this behavior is indicated by the abbreviation N or G in the row corresponding to the accusative case.

In Russian there are three declensions:
 The second declension is used for most masculine and neuter nouns.
 The third declension is used for feminine nouns ending in ь.

"time") and one masculine noun  "way". However, these nouns and their forms have sufficient similarity with feminine third declension nouns that some scholars such as Litnevskaya consider them to be non-feminine forms of this declension, as written in the tables below.

First declension
Most first-declension nouns are feminine, some masculine. The same endings apply for both genders.

After a sibilant (ж, ч, ш, щ) or a velar (or ) consonant,  is written.
After a sibilant,  is written when stressed;  when unstressed.
After a soft consonant,  is written when stressed;  when unstressed.

Examples:
 – a work/job,  – a bathhouse,  – a book,  – a line

Second declension – masculine nouns

Nouns ending in a consonant are marked in the following table with – (thus no ending).

Notes:
 After a sibilant<ref>Le Fleming, Svetlana & Kay, Susan E. Colloquial Russian: the Complete Course for Beginners, Routledge, 2007 , page25</ref> or a velar (or ) consonant,  is written, or, for some words,  ( —  — , etc.).
 After a sibilant,  is written.
 After a soft consonant,  is written when stressed;  when unstressed.
 After a sibilant,  is written when stressed;  when unstressed.

Examples:
 – a film/movie,  – a writer,  – a hero,  – a comment

Second declension – neuter nouns

 After a sibilant,  is written when stressed;  when unstressed.
 After a soft consonant,  is written when stressed;  when unstressed.
 After a consonant use  otherwise use .

Examples
 – a place,  – a sea,  – a building

Third declension

The third declension is mostly for feminine nouns, with some masculine and neuter.

 After a sibilant,  is written.

Examples:
 (f) – a bone,  (f) – a mouse,  (n) – a name

Irregular plural forms
There are various kinds of irregularities in forming plurals. Some words have an irregular plural form, but a few use suppletion, being substituted by a different root altogether. Historically, some of these irregularities come from older declensional patterns that have become mostly obsolete in modern Russian.

 If the word  has the lexical meaning "paper", then its declension is normal ( → ). If it has lexical meaning "leaf (of a tree)", its declension is  → .

 Undeclined nouns 
Some nouns (such as borrowings from other languages, abbreviations, etc.) are not modified when they change number and case. Most abbreviations are undeclined (one exception is ). Many people also think that Georgian surnames on  like  shouldn't be declined since they are originally something like Russian possessive genitives.

 Personal names 
Traditionally, a full Russian name consists of a person name ( – given name or first name), patronym ( – father's name as middle name) and a family name ( – surname or last name). All of these words have the same grammatical gender as biological one. Slavic, as well as Greek, Roman, Jewish and other person names of European or Semitic origin loaned centuries ago, have gender-specific versions of respective patronyms. Some person names also have versions for both males and females ( –  – ).

Additionally, Slavic names have short forms, usually meant for affectionate calls ( –  – ; equivalent of Johnny, Annie, etc.). Short forms by themselves can form "reemerging" vocative case (sometimes called neo-vocative); it is used for calling a familiar person, substituting nominative singular by removing last vowel ( –  –  –  – ). For this reason, neo-vocative is not possible for male names that can't produce short forms with a final vowel (including some popular ones). Likewise, there is a neo-vocative form for close relatives:  –  –  (mother – mommy – mom),  –  –  (father – daddy – dad). When replacing nominative plural (used for always plural nouns), it can be used for collective calls:  ("guys, lads") –  ("gals") – .

Most family names in Russia are also gender-specific (shown below in male/female pairs) and declinable like most words (including plural form to denote a married couple or a whole family, as "The Smiths"). They can be divided in these categories (sorted by occurrence):
Russian origin, gender-specific, declinable as nouns:  (unstressed for names four of more syllables long),  (sometimes stressed for names two syllables long);
Russian origin, gender-agnostic, indeclinable: , ;
Ukrainian origin, gender-specific, declinable as adjectives: , ;
Ukrainian or Belorussian origin, gender-agnostic, indeclinable:  (mostly stressed), ;
Other Slavic origin, gender-specific, declinable as adjectives: , ;

Examples:

Here male name is composed of 2nd declension nouns, but there are exceptional endings for Instrumental (patronym: , not -ом; family name: , not ). Female name is in 1st declension, but ending  is used for a family name in all oblique cases. Plural follows adjectival declension, except that Nominative is short .

Adjectives
A Russian adjective is usually placed before the noun it qualifies, and it agrees with the noun in case, gender, and number. With the exception of a few invariant forms borrowed from other languages, such as  'beige' or  'khaki', most adjectives follow one of a small number of regular declension patterns, except for some which provide difficulty in forming the short form. In modern Russian, the short form appears only in the nominative and is used when the adjective is in a predicative role; formerly (as in the bylinas) short adjectives appeared in all other forms and roles, which are not used in modern language, but are nonetheless understandable to Russian speakers as they are declined exactly like nouns of the corresponding gender.

Adjectives may be divided into three general groups:
 Qualitative — denote quality of the object; only adjectives in this group generally have degrees of comparison.
 Relational — denote some sort of relationship; unlikely to act as a predicate or have a short form.
 Possessive — denote belonging to a specific subject; have some declensional peculiarities.

Adjectival declension

This is sometimes called the  rule.
Accusative in the masculine singular, and in the plural for all genders, depends on animacy, as for nouns.
Instrumental feminine ending  for all adjectives has alternative form , which differs only stylistically from the standard form.

Russian differentiates between hard-stem (as above) and soft-stem adjectives. Note the following:

Examples:

Before 1917, adjectival declension looked quite different, at least in writing; for example, there were special feminine plural forms, as in French. In modern editions of classical poetry some elements of this system are still used if they are important for rhyme or metrics.

 Comparison of adjectives 
Comparison forms are usual only for qualitative adjectives and adverbs. Comparative and superlative synthetic forms are not part of the paradigm of original adjectives but are different lexical items, since not all qualitative adjectives have them. A few adjectives have irregular forms that are declined like ordinary adjectives:  'big' —  'bigger',  'good' —  'better'.

Another method of indicating comparison uses analytical forms with adverbs  'more' /  'less' and  'most' /  'most' /  'least':  'kind' —  'kinder' —  'the kindest'. This pattern is rarely used if special comparative forms exist.

 Possessive adjectives 
Possessive adjectives are used in Russian to a lesser extent than in most other Slavic languages, but are still in use. They answer the questions  (whose?) and denote only animated possessors. Alternative for possessive adjectives are possessive genitives which are used much more commonly.

Suffix  is used to form adjective from a word denoting single human which is masculine and ends on consonant; selection depends on if the stem hard or soft. Both types are more common in spoken language than in literary (though being acceptable in both styles) and generally are forms of kinship terms, given names and their diminutives:  —  'mom's',  —  'father's',  —  'Sasha's' /for diminutives from both Alexandr and Alexandra/. Words of this type also are common as Russian surnames, like  (derived from  'gun' which used to be a nickname).

Declension of such adjectives is nominal in nominative and accusative (except masculine and plural animated accusative) and adjectival for other forms.

There exist many stable expressions which include possessive adjectives following either of the two declensions shown above:  (Noah's ark, from  "Noah"),  (Euclidean geometry, from  "Euclides"),  (the Field of Mars),  (the Augean stables, from  "Augeas"),  (a wolfish appetite, from  "wolf"),  (crocodile tears, from  "crocodile"),  (every God-given day, from  "God"), etc. Notice how the latter two differ from the general rule:  has  ending as if a crocodile were a male human, and  has  ending as if God is treated as an animal or (in Old Russian) a crowd (perhaps, symbolizing Holy Trinity).

Pronouns

Personal pronouns

 Russian is subject to T-V distinction. The respectful form of the singular you is the same as the plural form. Compare the distinction between du and Sie in German or tu and vous in French.
 When a preposition is used directly before a 3rd-person pronoun in oblique cases,  is prefixed: , etc.

Demonstrative pronouns

Possessive adjectives and pronouns

Unlike English, Russian uses the same form for a possessive adjective and the corresponding possessive pronoun. The following rules apply:
 Possessive pronouns agree with possessed noun in case, gender, and number:  (plural) "Where are my glasses?";  (feminine accusative) Have you seen my daughter?, even if her father is talking. As in English, they also depend on the person and number of the possessor.
 The reflexive pronoun  is used when the possessor is the subject of the clause, whatever the person, gender, and number of that subject.
Unlike other genitives used with a possessive meaning, in modern Russian these words are usually placed before the object of possession. In colloquial speech, however, sometimes "adjectived" forms are used:  (masc./neut. sing. possessor, rare),  (pl. possessor); they are declined as adjectives.
 Example of the difference between reflexive and non-reflexive pronouns:
 “Он лю́бит свою́ жену́ = He loves his (own) wife”;
 “Он лю́бит его́ жену́ = He loves his (someone else's) wife” (for literary Russian);
 “Он лю́бит его́ = He loves him/it”.
 Unlike Latin where a similar rule applies for the 3rd person only, Russian accepts using reflexives for all persons:
 “Я люблю́ свою́ жену́ = I love my wife”;
 “Я люблю́ себя́ = I love myself”.

Interrogative pronouns

Numerals
Russian has several main classes of numerals: cardinal, ordinal, collective, and fractional constructions. It also has other types of words, relative to numbers:
multiplicative adjectives and compound nouns:  – single (sole, unique),  – double,  – quadrupled,  – three-times (also as repetition adjective),  – five-cylinder;  – monotony,  – triplicity,  – heptathlon;
multiplicative verbs:  – triple,  – halve (imp./perf. with/without - suffix);
multiplicative adverbs:  – doubly,  – five times (for compound adverbs:  – 5 times faster),  – half as;
collective and repetition adverbs:  – three together;  – four times (with a verb for repeated action or a noun for repeatedly acquired state or title);
two interrogative and negative adverbs:  – how much/many?;  – none (at all);
counting-system, ordinal and partitive adjectives:  – binary,  – hexadecimal;  – primary;  – three-sided (tripartite);
two dual numerals:  – both (masculine/neuter),  – both (feminine); but no single word for "neither";
multiple loaned numerals (also used as prefixes and first roots for compound words) from Greek, Latin and (for musical terminology) Italian;
Here are the numerals from 0 to 10:

Declension of cardinal numerals
Different Russian numerals have very different types of declension. The word  (one) is declined by number, gender (in the singular), and case. The word  (two) is declined by gender and case, all other numbers have only case to decline by. The words for 50, 60, 70, 80, 200, 300, 400, 500, 600, 700, 800, 900 are unique for Russian, as they decline not only with ending in their end, but also with part of word in their middle (since they are originally composed from two words): Nom.  (50) – Gen.  etc. (compare  –  "five tens").

Compound number phrases are created without any unions:  "153 fishes". All numerals are declined concurrently, albeit not always in the spoken language. If numeral is in Nominative or Accusative, ending of the noun is defined by the last numeral word (the least order, see examples below), but this may not be true for an adjective attached to this noun.

Most numbers ending with "1" (in any gender: ,) require Nominative singular for a noun:  (21 cars),  (151 people). Most numbers ending with "2", "3", "4" require Genitive singular:  (3 dogs),  (42 windows). All other numbers (including 0 and those ending with it) require Genitive plural:  (5 apples),  (10 rubles). Genitive plural is also used for numbers ending with 11 to 14 and with inexact numerals:  (111 meters);  (many houses). Nominative plural is used only without numerals:  (these houses); cf.  (3 houses; G. sg.). These rules apply only for integer numbers. For rational numbers see below.

In oblique cases, noun and number take both this case, except that the numbers ending with "thousand", "million", "billion" etc. (nouns:  (f.),  (m.),  (m.)) in singular or in plural are regarded as nouns and always require Genitive case in plural:  (Instr.) Initial (leftmost) numeral "1" can be omitted in combinations  ( – 1001 nights), etc.

Approximate numbers are colloquially formed by reversing word order, exchanging numeral and noun:  (≈3 minutes). Ranges (hyphenated) are also possible:  (5–6 days),  (probably 5–6 days). The word  (minus) declines if standalone, but does not for negative numbers:  – minus three degrees (wrong: *); however:  – three minuses.

The numbers from 11 to 19 are: оди́ннадцать, двена́дцать, трина́дцать, четы́рнадцать, пятна́дцать, шестна́дцать, семна́дцать, восемна́дцать, девятна́дцать. They decline in the same way as 20 (два́дцать).

For numbers above 1,000 Russian uses a modified short scale with the following loanwords: миллио́н (106, million; as for both long and short scales), миллиа́рд (109, milliard; as for long scale – an exception), триллио́н (1012, trillion), квадриллио́н (1015, quadrillion), квинтиллио́н (1018, quintillion), etc. (continued as short scale). They decline in the same way as миллио́н. Russian uses words  (billion) and numerals with -ard endings only in historical texts or literal translations. Also,  (billiard) is a noun meaning a cue sport.

Blue digits are indicatives of case endings, marked by blue letters.

 Collective numerals 
Collective numerals are used in Russian (and many other Slavic languages) instead of usual cardinal ones in specific lexical and semantic situations. Russian collective numerals are different from the cardinal numerals in that the former emphasize ‘the totality’ or ‘the aggregate as a whole’, while the latter – ‘the
individuated quantity’. Only numerals from 2 to 7 are actively used nowadays, while 8 to 10 are seldom used and 11–13 are not normative; word  (both) is also considered to be collective numeral. In nominative and accusative, they always force the noun into genitive plural form (while their own accusative form is dependent from animacy of the noun): . (Three friends went hunting [together], I see two men [together], I see two sleighs [together].) These numerals are seldom used in oblique cases, especially instrumental. A brief table of usage situations follows:

 Collective numerals denote number of persons likely to have collective behaviour, i.e., existence in groups, not one by one:  'militants',  'inhabitants',  'passengers',  'soldiers'.
 Collective numbers are used while denoting several persons to emphasize unity, cohesion of this group.
 Contexts of nominal groups with collective numerals have properties showing their individualization and dedication: referentness, empathy, definiteness; they are unlikely to be out of focus.

 Ordinal numerals 
Ordinal numbers have grammatically no differences with adjectives. While forming them, upper three orders of numerals are agglutinated to nearest dividing power of 1000, which results in constructing some of the longest natural Russian words, e.g. In the latter example, only the last word is declined with noun.

 Fractions 
Fractions are formed as: (how much parts), expressed by cardinal number in case of the phrase, plus (of how numerous parts), expressed by ordinal number; the construction is formed as like it were related to word  "part" (grammatically feminine), which is usually omitted. Noun to such construction always comes in Genitive single, also as like it belonged to word часть:  "92/50 tons".

They are also often added with preposition , while form of noun appears to be related to the integer part rather than to the fraction:  [Instr.]  [Gen.] "10 1/4 turns".

For "1 1/2" there is a special word  (feminine полторы́; in oblique cases полу́тора; requires Genitive):  – 3/2 apples. It can be used with larger numbers ( – 1 500,  – 1 500 000) and, for approximate values, with smaller numbers ( – ≈15,  – ≈150). There was also now-outdated form  for exactly 150. As with other single-word numerals, it's possible to form nouns and multiplicative adjectives, associated with "1.5":  (old truck with 1.5 tonnes of payload capacity),  (1.5 liter plastic bottle for beverage);  (something of 150% amount). Also (colloquially):  "almost nobody" (lit. one and a half men)''.

To read decimal fractions, convert them to simple ones: 2,71828 = 2+71828/100000 . After integer in such cases is often used word  (substantiated adjective "full, integer", which also refers to omitted word  and thus is feminine): 3,14 –   (union is often omitted); word  can appear also in naming non-decimal simple fractions: 2 3/8 – . Zero before comma is often read: 0,01 = 0+1/100 – . Informally, decimal fractional part can be read more conveniently as sequence of simple digits and numbers: . Same method is used to read long numerals unrelated to a noun (phone numbers, address indexes, etc.), grouping two or three digits: 123406 –  (forced  added to avoid missing digit).

Count form
Russian also has so-called "count form" ( for use by nouns in numerical phrases instead of genitive plural (for some words mandatory, for others optional), mainly with units of measure (especially derived from names):  (8 bits; not *),  (16 bytes),  (220 volts),  (5 kilograms; optional). But:  (amount of bytes),  (get rid of excess kilograms).

Count form also exists for paucal numbers (1.5, 2, 3 and 4); usually it coincides with genitive singular, but has notable exceptions with stressed endings:  (2 hours), but  (middle of an hour);  (22 balls), but  (volume of the ball);  (3 rows/lines), but  (step out of the line);  (4 steps), but  (half a step).  (half an hour) is additional exception; other nouns with  prefix does not have stressed  ending.

Count forms for adjectives and nouns with adjectival declension after numerals require genitive plural and nominative plural:  (G. pl.) (G. sg.) "2 best players";  (N. pl.) (N. pl.) lit. "3 green straight lines", but  (G. pl.) (G. pl.) (G. sg.) lit. "3 green straight strokes".

Notes

References

declension
Declension